Rose Bowl or Rosebowl may refer to:
 Rose Bowl Game, an annual American college football game
 Rose Bowl (stadium), Pasadena, California, site of the football game, and the home stadium of the UCLA Football team
 Rose Bowl (cricket ground), West End, Hampshire, England
 Rose Bowl (horse) (1972–1994)
 Rose Bowl Aquatics Center, Pasadena, California
 Rose Bowl series, a women's cricket series between Australia and New Zealand
 Rose Bowl (film), a 1936 American film
 Rose Bowl Stakes, a horse race in Newbury, Berkshire, England

See also
 Rose Parade, an annual New Year's Day parade in Pasadena, California
 U2360° at the Rose Bowl, a concert video